Shahmoradi (also Romanized as Shahmorādī and Shahmaradī, and Shāh Mardī) is a village in Howmeh Rural District, in the Central District of Minab County, Hormozgan Province, Iran. At the 2006 census, its population was 712, in 148 families.

References 

Populated places in Minab County